CocoaPods is an application level dependency manager for Objective-C, Swift and any other languages that run on the Objective-C runtime, such as RubyMotion, that provides a standard format for managing external libraries. It was developed by Eloy Durán and Fabio Pelosin, who continue to manage the project with the help and contributions of many others. They began development in August 2011 and made the first public release on September 1, 2011. CocoaPods is strongly inspired by a combination of the Ruby projects RubyGems and Bundler.

CocoaPods focuses on source-based distribution of third party code and automatic integration into Xcode projects.

CocoaPods runs from the command line and is also integrated in JetBrains' AppCode integrated development environment. It installs dependencies (e.g. libraries) for an application by specification of dependencies rather than by manually copying source files. Besides installing from many different sources, a “master” spec repository—containing metadata for many open-source libraries—is maintained as a Git repository and hosted on GitHub. CocoaPods dependency resolution system is powered by Molinillo which is also used by other large projects such as Bundler, RubyGems, and Berkshelf.

Example
The following Podfile example installs the AFNetworking and CocoaLumberjack libraries:

 platform :ios
 pod 'AFNetworking',    '~> 2.0.0'
 pod 'CocoaLumberjack', '< 1.7'

 target 'MyApp'

See also
 List of build automation software
 List of software package management systems

References

External links
 Official website
 Official source code repositories

Free package management systems